XWA may refer to:

XWA (radio), or XWA / 9AM, call letters assigned to a radio facility from 1919 to 1922 that later became CFCF, CIQC and eventually CINW, a now-defunct radio station in Montreal
XWA, IATA code of Williston Basin International Airport
XWA (professional wrestling), British professional wrestling promotion
XWA Frontier Sports Championship, a professional wrestling championship contested for in the XWA
X-Wing Alliance, a computer or video game